Zsófia Gubacsi (born 6 April 1981) is a Hungarian former professional tennis player.

She won one WTA Tour singles title at the 2001 Morocco Open in Casablanca, and was originally coached by Jozsef Hegedus, but he would later be replaced by Attila Door.

Personal life
Gubacsi was born to parents Julianna (née Harangozo) and Mihaly Gubacsi, who own a hotel. She is a baseline player who likes all court surfaces, and she says her best shot is a secret. Her goal is to reach the top 50 in tennis.

WTA career finals

Singles: 1 (title)

Doubles: 3 (1 title, 2 runner-ups)

ITF Circuit finals

Singles: 15 (6–9)

Doubles: 19 (8–11)

External links
 
 

1981 births
Living people
Hungarian female tennis players
Tennis players from Budapest